Pogonomyrmex is a genus of harvester ants, occurring primarily in the deserts of North, Central, and South America, with a single endemic species from Haiti.

Description
The genus name originated from the Greek language and refers to a beard-like structure, the psammophore, below the head (Greek πώγων/pōgōn, "beard" + μύρμηξ/murmēx, "ant"), which can be found in most species of the subgenus sensu stricto. The psammophore is used for gathering small seeds, helping to increase the efficiency of transportation of fine sand and pebbles during nest construction, or to carry eggs. However, this structure is missing in species of the subgenus Ephebomyrmex (Greek ἔφηβος/ephēbos, "beardless lad"), and these species generally have smaller individuals and colonies.

Venom
Pogonomyrmex (sensu stricto) workers have the most toxic venom documented in any insects, with Pogonomyrmex maricopa being the most toxic tested thus far. The venom is presumed to be an antivertebrate defense, specifically against predators that have evolved to selectively feed on them such as horned lizards. Very few insects have had the toxicity of their venoms formally tested, and other insects likely have more potent venoms.

Nests
These ants dig very deep nests with many underground chambers in which they keep seeds, from which they derive food for their larvae. The areas around most Pogonomyrmex (sensu stricto) nests tend to be utterly devoid of vegetation, and are easily seen from a distance.

Predation
In addition to horned lizards, predatory wasps in the genus Clypeadon feed only on Pogonomyrmex workers, paralyzing them with their venom, and carrying them back to a burrow where they will serve as food for the wasp's larva.

Species
As of 2014, there are 69 extant and 1 fossil species in the genus.

Pogonomyrmex abdominalis Santschi, 1929
Pogonomyrmex andinus Kusnezov, 1951
Pogonomyrmex anergismus Cole, 1954
Pogonomyrmex angustus Mayr, 1870
Pogonomyrmex anzensis Cole, 1968
Pogonomyrmex apache Wheeler, 1902
Pogonomyrmex atratus Santschi, 1922
Pogonomyrmex badius (Latreille, 1802)
Pogonomyrmex barbatus (Smith, 1858)
Pogonomyrmex bicolor Cole, 1968
Pogonomyrmex bigbendensis Francke & Merickel, 1982
Pogonomyrmex bispinosus (Spinola, 1851)
Pogonomyrmex brevibarbis Emery, 1906
Pogonomyrmex brevispinosus Cole, 1968
Pogonomyrmex bruchi Forel, 1913
Pogonomyrmex californicus (Buckley, 1866)
Pogonomyrmex carbonarius Mayr, 1868
Pogonomyrmex catanlilensis Gallardo, 1931
Pogonomyrmex coarctatus Mayr, 1868
Pogonomyrmex colei Snelling, 1982
Pogonomyrmex comanche Wheeler, 1902
Pogonomyrmex cunicularius Mayr, 1887
Pogonomyrmex desertorum Wheeler, 1902
†Pogonomyrmex fossilis Carpenter, 1930
Pogonomyrmex guatemaltecus Wheeler, 1914
Pogonomyrmex hoelldobleri Johnson, Overson & Moreau, 2013
Pogonomyrmex huachucanus Wheeler, 1914
Pogonomyrmex humerotumidus Vásquez-Bolaños & Mackay, 2004
Pogonomyrmex imberbiculus Wheeler, 1902
Pogonomyrmex inermis Forel, 1914
Pogonomyrmex kusnezovi Cuezzo & Claver, 2009
Pogonomyrmex laevigatus Santschi, 1921
Pogonomyrmex laevinodis Snelling, 1982
Pogonomyrmex laticeps Santschi, 1922
Pogonomyrmex lobatus Santschi, 1921
Pogonomyrmex longibarbis Gallardo, 1931
Pogonomyrmex magnacanthus Cole, 1968
Pogonomyrmex marcusi Kusnezov, 1951
Pogonomyrmex maricopa Wheeler, 1914
Pogonomyrmex mayri Forel, 1899
Pogonomyrmex mendozanus Cuezzo & Claver, 2009
Pogonomyrmex meridionalis Kusnezov, 1951
Pogonomyrmex micans Forel, 1914
Pogonomyrmex mohavensis Johnson & Overson, 2009
Pogonomyrmex montanus MacKay, 1980
Pogonomyrmex naegelii Emery, 1878
Pogonomyrmex occidentalis (Cresson, 1865)
Pogonomyrmex odoratus Kusnezov, 1949
Pogonomyrmex pima Wheeler, 1909
Pogonomyrmex pronotalis Santschi, 1922
Pogonomyrmex rastratus Mayr, 1868
Pogonomyrmex rugosus Emery, 1895
Pogonomyrmex salinus Olsen, 1934
Pogonomyrmex saucius Wheeler & Mann, 1914
Pogonomyrmex schmitti Forel, 1901
Pogonomyrmex snellingi Taber, 1998
Pogonomyrmex stefani Lattke, 2006
Pogonomyrmex striatinodus Fernández & Palacio, 1998
Pogonomyrmex subdentatus Mayr, 1870
Pogonomyrmex subnitidus Emery, 1895
Pogonomyrmex sylvestris Lattke, 1991
Pogonomyrmex tenuipubens Santschi, 1936
Pogonomyrmex tenuispinus Forel, 1914
Pogonomyrmex texanus Francke & Merickel, 1982
Pogonomyrmex theresiae Forel, 1899
Pogonomyrmex uruguayensis Mayr, 1887
Pogonomyrmex variabilis Santschi, 1916
Pogonomyrmex vermiculatus Emery, 1906
Pogonomyrmex wheeleri Olsen, 1934

Gallery

References

External links

 
Ant genera
Hymenoptera of North America
Hymenoptera of South America
Taxa named by Gustav Mayr